Adrian Barry Pennock (born 27 March 1971) is an English former footballer who played for Norwich City, Molde FK, AFC Bournemouth, Gillingham and Gravesend & Northfleet. He spent two years as Welling United manager before joining Stoke City to be first team coach. He left at the end of the 2012–13 season following the departure of Tony Pulis, and on 12 November 2013, he was appointed as a manager for Forest Green Rovers where he twice led them to record highest league finishes.

He left his position as head coach of League One side Gillingham in September 2017, and was appointed as manager of National League club Barrow the following month, a post he held until the end of the 2017–18 season. He then coached DPMM FC of Brunei, a team that plays in the Singapore Premier League.

Playing career
Although born in Ipswich and having grown up supporting Ipswich Town, Pennock began his career with their fiercest rivals, Norwich City, where he progressed through the ranks to turn professional in 1989. He was only to manage one appearance for the Canaries' first team, however, and in 1992 he was allowed to move to AFC Bournemouth for a fee of £30,000. He was a regular for the Cherries until he suffered a knee injury in December 1995 and was unable to regain his place in the team. In October 1996 his former Bournemouth manager, Tony Pulis signed him for Gillingham for £25,000.

Pennock spent over six years at Priestfield Stadium where he was a regular in the first team until a recurring knee injury took its toll. He developed a reputation as a practical joker whilst with Gillingham –  during one pre-season friendly he switched on the pitch sprinkler system during the match. He also scored a memorable own goal against Wigan Athletic in 2000 which spawned a recurring terrace chant of "He only scores own goals". Such was his affinity with the fans that he even acquired his own fan club. On the pitch, he was named captain for the play-off final in 2000 which saw the Gills promoted to the Football League First Division for the first time in their history.

Injuries forced Pennock to retire from League football in 2003, after which he signed for Football Conference side Gravesend & Northfleet, where he was also assistant manager.

In January 2006 he was involved in a dispute with Gillingham chairman Paul Scally over a testimonial match which Pennock alleged he was promised as part of his final contract at Gillingham but which never materialised.

Managerial career

Welling United
In January 2005 Pennock was appointed manager of Welling United of the Conference South and by the end of the season had guided them to their best league position for six years.

Stoke City (coach)
He left Welling at the end of the 2006–07 season to take up a coaching position at Stoke City, under his former Gillingham manager, Tony Pulis. He was initially appointed youth team boss at Stoke. In January 2010, Pennock expressed an interest in one day returning to management. In the summer of 2011 he made the step up to become first team coach at Stoke. He left the club at the end of the 2012–13 season.

Forest Green Rovers
On 12 November 2013, Pennock was appointed as the new manager of Conference Premier side Forest Green Rovers. He led the club to a 10th-place finish at the end of the 2013–14 season.

In January 2015, he was linked with the vacant managerial role at Gillingham, however he issued a statement declaring his aim to remain at Forest Green.

At the end of the 2014–15 season he led Forest Green to a record highest league finish of 5th in the Conference Premier, meaning that the club secured a place in the play-offs for the first time. Forest Green were knocked out in the semi-finals, losing 3–0 on aggregate against Bristol Rovers.

On 4 September 2015, after leading Forest Green to seven straight wins in the renamed National League at the start of the 2015–16 season, he was named August Manager of the Month. On 5 September 2015, he led the club to an eighth straight league win at the start of the season with victory at Chester – a National League record. On 5 February 2016, he was named National League January Manager of the Month having guided Forest Green to six straight wins.

Despite taking Forest Green to 2nd in the National League, which was another record highest finish, he was relieved of his duties on 27 April 2016, just one week before the play-offs, after a poor run of results that had failed to see his side win in seven games.

In November 2016, he returned to Welling United after being appointed as a consultant to new manager Jamie Day, who had been his assistant at Forest Green.

Gillingham
On 4 January 2017, Pennock was appointed as the new head coach of his former club and League One side Gillingham. Steve Lovell and Jamie Day were announced as part of his team of coaching staff. Pennock and Day left Gillingham by mutual consent on 25 September 2017, following a 3–0 defeat at Rochdale.

Barrow 
On 27 October 2017, Pennock was appointed as manager of National League side Barrow. Barrow parted company with Pennock on 18 May 2018, with the side having narrowly avoided relegation.

Brunei DPMM FC 
At the conclusion of the 2018 Singapore Premier League season, DPMM FC appointed Pennock as manager for the 2019 season. Pennock led the side to their second SPL title in his first season in charge.

Career statistics

Player
Source:

A.  The "Other" column constitutes appearances and goals in the Football League Trophy and Football League play-offs.

Manager
As of match played 2 November 2019

Honours

Player 
Gillingham

 Football League Second Division Playoffs: 2000

Manager 
DPMM

 Singapore Premier League: 2019

Individual

 National League Manager of the Month: August 2015, January 2016
 Singapore Premier League Coach of the Year: 2019

References
Specific 

General

External links
 
 
 Profile at ex-canaries.co.uk

1971 births
Living people
Sportspeople from Ipswich
English footballers
Association football defenders
Norwich City F.C. players
Molde FK players
AFC Bournemouth players
Gillingham F.C. players
Ebbsfleet United F.C. players
English Football League players
National League (English football) players
Eliteserien players
English football managers
Welling United F.C. managers
Forest Green Rovers F.C. managers
Gillingham F.C. managers
National League (English football) managers
English Football League managers
Expatriate football managers in Brunei
Stoke City F.C. non-playing staff
English expatriate footballers
Expatriate footballers in Norway
DPMM FC managers